Cat's eye and other variations may refer to:

Nature
 Cat's Eye Nebula, a planetary nebula

Biology
 Cat's eye, the visual organ of a cat; see cat senses
 Cat eye snail (Turbo castanea), or other species from the genus Turbo
 Cat's eye snail (Lunella smaragdus), a sea snail endemic to New Zealand
 Cat eye syndrome, a symptom of 'trisomy 22'

Mineralogy and gemology
 Cymophane, sometimes called "cat's eye"; a variety of the mineral chrysoberyl
 Cat's eye effect, or chatoyancy, the reflective property of certain gems

Arts and entertainment

Literature
 Cat's Eye (novel), a 1988 novel by Margaret Atwood
 Catseye (novel), a 1961 science fiction novel by Andre Norton
 Catseye (comics), Sharon Smith, a character from Marvel Comics
 Cat's Eye (manga), a 1981 Japanese manga about three cat burglar sisters

Film and TV
 Cat's Eye (1985 film), a film based on works by Stephen King
 Cat's Eye (1997 film), a live-action feature film based on the manga and anime
 C.A.T.S. Eyes, a UK television series

Music
 Cat's Eyes (band), a UK alternative pop duo
 "Cat's Eye" (song), a 1983 song by Anri, later covered by MAX

Products
 Cat eye glasses, a style of horn-rimmed glasses designed for women
 Cat's eye (toy), a kind of toy marble
 Cat's Eye (cocktail), a gin-based cocktail
 Cat's eye (road), a type of road marker using retroreflectors
 Cat eye tube, an electron tube used as a visual indicator

Other uses
 CatEye Inc., a Japanese company, manufacturer of bicycle lights and reflectors

See also

 
 
 Cat (disambiguation)
 Eye (disambiguation)